Dimethylphenethylamine may refer to:

 α,α-Dimethylphenethylamine (phentermine)
 N,α-Dimethylphenethylamine (methamphetamine)
 N,β-Dimethylphenethylamine (phenpromethamine)
 2,α-Dimethylphenethylamine (ortetamine)
 3,α-Dimethylphenethylamine (3-methylamphetamine)
 4,α-Dimethylphenethylamine (4-methylamphetamine)
 N,N-Dimethylphenethylamine
α,β-Dimethylphenethylamine (2-phenyl-3-aminobutane)